The members of the National Assembly of Zambia from 1973 until 1978 were elected on 5 December 1973. The country was a one-party state at the time, meaning the only party represented was the United National Independence Party. An additional ten members were nominated by President Kenneth Kaunda.

List of members

Elected members

Replacements by by-election

Non-elected members

References

1973